Serruria adscendens is a species of flowering plant in the family Proteaceae, endemic to South Africa.

References

adscendens
Flora of South Africa